The Curtiss Autoplane, invented by Glenn Curtiss in 1917, is widely considered the first attempt to build a roadable aircraft. Although the vehicle was capable of lifting off the ground, it never achieved full flight.

Development and design

The Autoplane was a triplane, using the wings from a Curtiss Model L trainer, with a small foreplane mounted on the aircraft's nose. The Autoplane's aluminum body resembled a Model T and had three seats in an enclosed cabin, with the pilot/chauffeur sitting in the front seat and the two passengers side-by side to the rear. It used a four-blade pusher propeller, and a twin-boom tail. A  Curtiss OXX engine drove the propeller via shaft and belts. The aircraft had a four-wheel undercarriage, with the front two wheels being steerable. The wings and tail could be detached for use as an automobile.

It was shown at the Pan-American Aeronautic Exposition at New York City in February 1917. It made a few short hops before the entry of the United States into World War I in April 1917 ended development of the Autoplane.

Specifications

References

Citations

Bibliography

External links

, patent filed February 14, 1917; issued February 18, 1919

Roadable aircraft
Single-engined pusher aircraft
Autoplane
1910s United States civil utility aircraft
Triplanes